In abstract algebra, an associated prime of a module M over a ring R is a type of prime ideal of R that arises as an annihilator of a (prime) submodule of M.  The set of associated primes is usually denoted by  and sometimes called the assassin or assassinator of  (word play between the notation and the fact that an  associated prime is an annihilator).

In commutative algebra, associated primes are linked to the Lasker–Noether primary decomposition of ideals in commutative Noetherian rings. Specifically, if an ideal J is decomposed as a finite intersection of primary ideals, the radicals of these primary ideals are prime ideals, and this set of prime ideals coincides with  Also linked with the concept of "associated primes" of the ideal are the notions of isolated primes and embedded primes.

Definitions
A nonzero R module N is called a prime module if the annihilator  for any nonzero submodule N'  of N. For a prime module N,  is a prime ideal in R.

An associated prime of an R module M is an ideal of the form  where N is a prime submodule of M. In commutative algebra the usual definition is different, but equivalent: if R is commutative, an associated prime P of M is a prime ideal of the form  for a nonzero element m of M or equivalently  is isomorphic to a submodule of M.

A module is called coprimary if xm = 0 for some nonzero m ∈ M implies xnM = 0 for some positive integer n.  A nonzero finitely generated module M over a commutative Noetherian ring is coprimary if and only if it has exactly one associated prime. A submodule N of M is called P-primary if  is coprimary with P.  An ideal I is a P-primary ideal if and only if ; thus, the notion is a generalization of a primary ideal.

Properties
Most of these properties and assertions are given in  starting on page 86.

 If M' ⊆M, then  If in addition M'  is an essential submodule of M, their associated primes coincide.
 It is possible, even for a commutative local ring, that the set of associated primes of a finitely generated module is empty. However, in any ring satisfying the ascending chain condition on ideals (for example, any right or left Noetherian ring) every nonzero module has at least one associated prime.
 Any uniform module has either zero or one associated primes, making uniform modules an example of coprimary modules.
 For a one-sided Noetherian ring, there is a surjection from the set of isomorphism classes of indecomposable injective modules onto the spectrum  If R is an Artinian ring, then this map becomes a bijection.
Matlis' Theorem: For a commutative Noetherian ring R, the map from the isomorphism classes of indecomposable injective modules to the spectrum is a bijection. Moreover, a complete set of representatives for those classes is given by  where  denotes the injective hull and  ranges over the prime ideals of R.
 For a Noetherian module M over any ring, there are only finitely many associated primes of M.
For the case for commutative Noetherian rings, see also Primary decomposition#Primary decomposition from associated primes.

Examples
If R is the ring of integers, then non-trivial free abelian groups and non-trivial abelian groups of prime power order are coprimary.
If R is the ring of integers and M a finite abelian group, then the associated primes of M are exactly the primes dividing the order of M.
The group of order 2 is a quotient of the integers Z (considered as a free module over itself), but its associated prime ideal (2) is not an associated prime of Z.

Notes

References 
Bourbaki, Algèbre commutative

 

Commutative algebra
Prime ideals
Module theory